Philadelphia, Wilmington and Baltimore Railroad Freight Shed is a historic freight station located in the Southwest Center City neighborhood of Philadelphia, Pennsylvania, along Broad Street. It was built by the Philadelphia, Wilmington and Baltimore Railroad in 1878, and is a large 1 1/2-story brick and stone building in the Late Gothic Revival style. It measures 99 feet, 5 inches wide and 235 feet long. It has a long, sloping roof supported by a Fink truss system, with glazed monitors.

The site was the first stop in Philadelphia for President Abraham Lincoln's funeral train in 1865.

The shed was used for passenger trains for four years, but was dedicated solely to freight operations after January 1882. The passenger station, along Washington Avenue, was demolished by the federal government during World War II to make space to store Marine Corps munitions and vehicles awaiting transport.

By the late 1960s, the shed was sold for use as a warehouse. The head house and eight eastern bays were demolished a few years later. 

In 2011, the shed was added to the National Register of Historic Places.

In 2016, developer Alterra Property Group began work on a $100 million mixed-use development that would restore and make use of the train site in what would be called Lincoln Square. The shed itself was rehabilitated and an eastern entrance added to create a space for a Sprouts supermarket. Designed by Philadelphia architectural firm Kelly Maiello, the project received several awards for preservation and adaptive reuse.

References

External links

Historic American Buildings Survey in Philadelphia
Railway stations on the National Register of Historic Places in Philadelphia
Gothic Revival architecture in Pennsylvania
Transport infrastructure completed in 1876
Southwest Center City, Philadelphia
Freight Shed